is a white, square, triangle or round surimi product (fish or meat paste) with a soft, mild taste. It is believed to have been invented during the Edo period in Japan by a chef,  of Suruga, and the dish is named after him. It can be eaten as an ingredient in oden or soup. It can also be fried or broiled.

In Shizuoka Prefecture, whole sardines are used, and the resulting product has a bluish-gray color. This is called kuro hanpen (黒はんぺん), literally "black hanpen".

Hanpen is made from grated Japanese mountain yam, surimied Alaska pollock, salt, and seaweed stock (kombu-dashi).

See also

References

Surimi